Invitation to the Waltz is a 1935 British historical musical film directed  by Paul Merzbach and starring Lilian Harvey, Wendy Toye and Carl Esmond. It was based on a play by Eric Maschwitz.

Production
It was made by British International Pictures at Elstree Studios. The film's sets were designed by John Mead and Clarence Elder. Much of the film's score consists of extracts of classical music arranged by Walter Goehr. It was the only film made in Britain by the London-born German star Harvey. Harvey had returned from Hollywood and signed a three-film contract with British International Pictures, but after making only this film she returned to Germany and agreed a new contract with UFA.

Synopsis
In London Jenny, an aspiring ballet dancer, meets an aide to the Duke of Wuerttemberg who is in Britain for a marriage alliance and financial treaty to supply troops to Britain for the war against Napoleon. After being discovered by an Italian impresario she goes to Venice to be trained as a great dancer. The visiting Duke of Wuerttemberg becomes fascinated with her and engages her to perform at the state operate house in his capital of Stuttgart, hoping also to make her his mistress.

The British authorities encourage Jenny to go to Stuttgart and try to live extravagantly at the Duke's expense in the hope that a shortage of funds with compel him to renew his treaty against Napoleon. However at the border she once again meets the handsome aide she had first encountered in London, who has been ordered to escort her, and who is hurt by the fact that she now appears to be the Duke's lover. Unable to reveal the true purpose of her mission to him, she outrages him and the inhabitants of the Duchy by the exorbitant demands she makes of their ruler.

Having finally persuaded the Duke to sign the treaty with Britain, her plans to escape from the Duchy are wrecked when Napoleon invades and captures Stuttgart. Forced to appear in a command performance for the Emperor, she is eventually able to cross the border in the company of the Duke's aide.

Cast

References

Bibliography
 Bergfelder, Tim & Cargnelli, Christian. Destination London: German-speaking emigrés and British cinema, 1925-1950. Berghahn Books, 2008.
 Low, Rachael. Filmmaking in 1930s Britain. George Allen & Unwin, 1985.
 Wood, Linda. British Films, 1927-1939. British Film Institute, 1986.

External links
 
 
 

1935 films
1935 musical comedy films
British black-and-white films
1930s spy comedy films
1930s historical comedy films
British historical comedy films
Films directed by Paul Merzbach
British films based on plays
British spy comedy films
British musical comedy films
Films set in the 1800s
Films set in London
Films set in Germany
Films set in Venice
Films shot at British International Pictures Studios
British historical musical films
1930s historical musical films
Films scored by Walter Goehr
1930s English-language films
1930s British films